El amor llegó más tarde (English: Love Came Later is a Mexican telenovela produced by Irene Sabido for Televisa in 1979.

Cast 
Diana Bracho as Mrs. Dobuti
Sergio Bustamante
Magda Guzmán
Jorge Ortiz de Pinedo
July Furlong 
 Enrique Barrera- Eduardo
Rebeca Rambal-Lucy
Carmen Delgado-Pili

References

External links 

Mexican telenovelas
1979 telenovelas
Televisa telenovelas
Spanish-language telenovelas
1979 Mexican television series debuts
1979 Mexican television series endings